New Well is a  settlement in South Australia. It is in sandy cropping country in the northern Murray Mallee region, southwest of Waikerie.

The New Well school opened in 1919 but is no longer in use. New Well Hall opened in 1926, along with a new store.

References

Towns in South Australia